Life Is Beautiful is a 2010 South Korean television series starring Song Chang-eui, Lee Sang-woo, Lee Sang-yoon and Nam Sang-mi. It aired on SBS from March 20 to November 7, 2010 on Saturdays and Sundays at 21:45 for 63 episodes.

Aside from scoring high ratings that were in the mid-twenty range during its run, the series is notable for its sensitive portrayal of a loving, openly gay couple in a Korean drama on primetime network television. Although the approach to homosexual themes is quite sympathetic, it has been argued that "major changes in the last episodes of 'Life is Beautiful' were made due to the strong opposition towards the issue," and that there are "no kissing scenes between the main actors in 'Life is Beautiful' in the midst of endless kissing scenes in other K-dramas that depict heterosexual couples."

Plot
Set in Jeju, the drama revolves around a loving, multi-generation family led by the parents Yang Byung-tae (Kim Yeong-cheol) and Kim Min-jae (Kim Hae-sook), and their four children Tae-sub (Song Chang-eui), Ji-hye (Woo Hee-jin), Ho-sub (Lee Sang-yoon) and Cho-rong (Nam Gyu-ri), as well as assorted grandparents and uncles. The story follows the family's everyday lives and conflicts, including oldest daughter Ji-hye's marital problems with her husband Soo-il (Lee Min-woo); younger son Ho-sub's pursuit of his mother's assistant, Yeon-joo (Nam Sang-mi); and oldest son Tae-sub's romantic pairing with divorced professor Kyung-soo (Lee Sang-woo), whose homosexual relationship their families react to while addressing issues of personal, social, and familial acceptance, leading to, finally, love and understanding.

Cast
Yang family
Kim Yong-rim as Byung-tae's mother
Choi Jung-hoon as Byung-tae's father
Kim Yeong-cheol as Yang Byung-tae
Kim Hae-sook as Kim Min-jae
Kim Sang-joong as Yang Byung-joon
Yoon Da-hoon as Yang Byung-kil
Song Chang-eui as Yang Tae-sub
Lee Sang-yoon as Yang Ho-sub
Nam Gyu-ri as Yang Cho-rong

Lee family
Lee Min-woo as Lee Soo-il
Woo Hee-jin as Yang Ji-hye
Jung Da-bin as Lee Ji-na

Park family
Lee Sang-hoon as Mr. Park
Jo Mi-ryung as Yang Soo-ja
Kang Yi-seok as son

Extended cast
Jang Mi-hee as Jo Ah-ra
Nam Sang-mi as Boo Yeon-joo
Lee Sang-woo as Kim Kyung-soo
Yoo Min as Chae-young
Kim Woo-hyun as Hyun-jin
Lee Kyun as Dong-geun
Bang Eun-hee as Jo Nam-shik
Im Ye-jin as Ji-hye's aunt (cameo)
Han Jin-hee as Min-jae's ex-husband (cameo)
Kim Jung-hwa as Woo Geum-ji (cameo)

Awards and nominations

Episode ratings

Source: TNS Media Korea

International broadcast
It aired on Japan's cable channel KNTV under the title Beautiful Life, beginning February 24, 2011.

It aired in Thailand on True4U beginning November 18, 2015.

See also
LGBT rights in South Korea

References

External links
  
 
 

2010 South Korean television series debuts
2010 South Korean television series endings
Seoul Broadcasting System television dramas
Korean-language television shows
South Korean LGBT-related television shows
Television shows written by Kim Soo-hyun (writer)
South Korean romance television series
2010s LGBT-related drama television series
Television series by Samhwa Networks